Ilona Dajbukát (1892–1976) was a Hungarian actress of Armenian ancestry.

Selected filmography
 Spring Shower (1932)
 Címzett ismeretlen (1932)
 Tomi, a megfagyott gyermek (1936)
 Zwischen Strom und Steppe (1939)
 Rózsafabot (1940)
 Taken by the Flood (1941)
 A Glass of Beer (1955)

Bibliography
 Burns, Bryan. World Cinema: Hungary. Fairleigh Dickinson University Press, 1996.

External links

1892 births
1976 deaths
Hungarian film actresses
Hungarian stage actresses
People from Simeria